Jabulani is a Zulu word meaning "rejoice".  It is often used as a first name, and in that context is often shortened to "Jabu".

People
 Jabulani Dubazana (born 1954), vocalist from Ladysmith Black Mambazo
 Jabulani Dube, Zimbabwean politician
 Jabulani Maluleke (born 1982), South African footballer
 Jabulani Mnguni (born 1972), South African footballer
 Jabu Moleketi (born 1957), South African politician
 Jabulani Ncubeni (born 1992), South African footballer
 Jabulani Shongwe (born 1990), South African footballer
 Jabulani Sibanda, Zimbabwean war veteran leader
 Jabulani Newby (born 1991), Canadian basketball player

Other uses
 Adidas Jabulani, the match ball used in the 2010 FIFA World Cup, held in South Africa
 Jabulani, a suburb of Soweto, South Africa
 "Jabulani", a song by PJ Powers
 Jabulani (Hugh Masekela album), a 2012 studio album by Hugh Masekela
 "Jabulani Africa", is a song composed by pastor Fini de Gersigny. Used in the Hosanna! Music's album Rejoice Africa (1993).

Zulu words and phrases